Domalde, Dómaldi or Dómaldr (Old Norse possibly "Power to Judge") was a legendary Swedish king of the House of Ynglings, cursed by his stepmother, according to Snorri Sturluson, with ósgæssa, "ill-luck". He was the son of Visbur.

Attestations

The luck of the king is the luck of the land, and Domalde's rule was marked by bad crops and starvation.  The first autumn, the Swedes sacrificed oxen at the temple at Uppsala, but the next harvest was not better. The second autumn, they sacrificed men, but the following crops were even worse.

The third year many Swedes arrived at Gamla Uppsala at the Thing of all Swedes and the chiefs decided they had to sacrifice the king. They sprinkled the statues of the gods with his blood (see Blót) and the good harvests returned.

He was succeeded by his son Domar whose reign was prosperous.

Snorri Sturluson wrote of Domalde in his Ynglinga saga (1225):

Snorri included a piece from Ynglingatal (9th century) in his account in the Heimskringla:

Translation: ‘It happened earlier that the sword-bearers [WARRIORS] reddened the ground with [the blood of] their leader. And the army of the land bore bloody weapons away from the lifeless Dómaldi when the race of the Swedes, eager for good harvests, had to sacrifice the enemy of the Jótar [= Dómaldi].’

The Historia Norwegiæ presents a Latin summary of Ynglingatal, older than Snorri's quotation:

The even earlier source Íslendingabók cites the line of descent in Ynglingatal and also gives Dómaldr as the successor of Visburr and the predecessor of Dómarr: vii Visburr. viii Dómaldr. ix Dómarr.

Notes

References
McKinnell, John (2005). Meeting the Other in Norse Myth and Legend. DS Brewer.

Sources
Ynglingatal
Ynglinga saga (part of the Heimskringla)
Historia Norwegiae

Mythological kings of Sweden
Human sacrifice